The Samsung Galaxy A42 5G (also known as Samsung Galaxy M42 5G in some countries) is a mid-range Android smartphone developed by Samsung Electronics as part of its A series line. The phone was announced on 2 September 2020 during Samsung's virtual "Life Unstoppable" event, and first released on 11 November 2020 as a successor to the Galaxy A41. The phone comes pre-installed with Android 10 and Samsung's custom One UI 2.5 software overlay that can be updated to Android 13 with One UI 5.0. It was rebranded as 'Samsung Galaxy M42 5G' in India and launched in the M series lineup on 1 May 2021.

Specifications

Hardware 
The Galaxy A42 5G is equipped with a Qualcomm Snapdragon 750G chipset. It has 128 GB of storage and 4, 6 or 8 GB of RAM, as well as a hybrid slot for dual Nano SIM and microSDXC cards.

The phone has a 6.6-inch HD+ Super AMOLED display, with a screen-to-body ratio of 84.3% and an aspect ratio of 20:9. Like its predecessor, there is an in-display optical fingerprint scanner.

The battery capacity is 5000 mAh, and fast charging is supported at up to 15 W.

Available color options are Prism Dot Black, Prism Dot White and Prism Dot Gray.

Cameras 
The Galaxy A42 5G has a quad-camera setup utilizing a 48 MP wide sensor, an 8 MP ultrawide sensor, a 5 MP macro sensor and a 5 MP depth sensor. The front-facing camera uses a 20 MP sensor, and is located in a U-shaped screen cutout. The rear camera is capable of recording 4K video at 30 fps, while the front camera is limited to 1080p.

Software 
The Galaxy A42 5G was launched with Android 10 and One UI 2.5. It received an update for Android 11 and One UI 3.1 in March 2021, and Android 12 and One UI 4.0 in January 2022. It got One UI 4.1 in April 2022, and got Android 13 with One UI 5.0 in January 2023.  Then it got One UI 5.1 on March 9 2023. Which it currently operates on.

History 
The Samsung Galaxy A42 5G was announced at Samsung's virtual "Life Unstoppable" event on September 2, 2020 alongside the Samsung Galaxy Tab A7 and various other products. It went on sale in November 2020.

See also 
Samsung Galaxy A41
Samsung Galaxy A51 5G
Samsung Galaxy A series

References

External links 

Samsung smartphones
Android (operating system) devices
Samsung Galaxy
Mobile phones introduced in 2020

Mobile phones with multiple rear cameras
Mobile phones with 4K video recording